Sara Ishaq is a Yemeni-Scottish film director. Ishaq directed and produced the critically acclaimed film Karama Has No Walls (2012). The short film was nominated for an Academy Award for Best Documentary (Short Subject) and BAFTA Scotland New Talents award. In 2013, her award-winning feature film The Mulberry House, which deals with her relationship with her family against the backdrop of the 2011 Yemeni uprising, premiered at IDFA.

Education 
Sara Ishaq attended Yemen Modern School (YMS) until the summer of 2001. At the age of 17, she continued her education at Linlithgow Academy in Scotland for a year of high school (2001-2002) before her higher education. Ishaq then joined University of Edinburgh in 2003, where she obtained her MA (Honours) in Humanities and Social Sciences, with a focus on religious studies, social and political theory, International & Human Rights Law & Modern Middle Eastern Studies in 2007.

She returned to academia in 2010 to pursue an MFA in Film Directing from Edinburgh College of Art that she finished in 2012.

Humanitarian Pursuits 
In 2011, Ishaq co-founded the #SupportYemen Media Collective, an organizing and strategizing effort to advance social justice, build a democratic civic state, promote non-violence and break the silence on human rights violations in Yemen. In 2017, Ishaq co-founded Comra - a film production company and academy for film training in Sana'a. 

Her earliest and most prolonged humanitarian pursuit occurred between 2009 and 2016, teaching rehabilitative yoga classes at the Nablus Women's Centre while volunteering with Project Hope (Palestine),  as well as various studios across Cairo (Egypt), focusing on women suffering from Post Traumatic Stress Disorder. In 2015 Ishaq was barred from entering Palestine to participate in the Palestine Festival of Literature and banned for another 5 years. Sara also ran Arts & Crafts workshops for children that had survived airstrikes in Yemen after the onslaught of the 2015 war.

Awards and grants 
The Mulberry House (2013)

 Jury Prize at This Human World Film Festival in Vienna
 Audience Favourite Award at Berwick Film Festival UK
Karama Has No Walls (2012)
 Nominations for Academy Award for Best Short Film 2014,
 One World Media Award 2013 
 BAFTA Scotland New Talents Award 2012
 Winner of 5 International Film Awards including Al-Jazeera TV Documentary Award & United Nations Association Film Festival Award

Filmography
 2013 The Mulberry House (Feature Documentary). Role: Director/Co-producer
 2012  Karama Has No Walls (Short Documentary). Role: Director/Producer
 2012 Marie My Girl (Short Drama). Role: Director

Television credits
 2007 Women in Black - BBC 2. Role: Location Coordinator/Researcher/Translator.
 2011 Yemen Uprising - BBC Newsnight & Our World Episodes. Role: Assistant Director/Camera Operator
 2012 Entrepreneurial Tribal Women – Media Trust. Role: Assistant Director/ Location Coordinator/Translator
 2013 Yemeni Child Prisoners On Death Row - Channel Four Unreported World. Role: Local Producer/Translator
 2016-2017 BBC Our World. Role: Documentary Development and Research

References

Sources

Living people
Yemeni film directors
Yemeni women film directors
British documentary film directors
Scottish people of Yemeni descent
1982 births
Scottish film directors
Scottish women film directors
21st-century Yemeni women
21st-century Yemeni people
Women documentary filmmakers